Hans Erkens (born 14 July 1952) is a former Dutch footballer who played for AFC Ajax (July 1976–June 1979).

Erkens was born in Schinnen, Limburg, Netherlands. After his retirement he became a sports director. He also played for Fortuna.

Honours
Ajax
 Eredivisie: 1976–77, 1978–79
 KNVB Cup: 1978–79; runner-up: 1977–78

References

1952 births
Living people
Dutch footballers
AFC Ajax players
People from Schinnen
Association football midfielders
Footballers from Limburg (Netherlands)
R.W.D. Molenbeek players
MVV Maastricht players
Fortuna Sittard players
Dutch expatriate sportspeople in Belgium
Dutch expatriate footballers
Expatriate footballers in Belgium